The 2017 African Sambo Championships were held in  Victoria, Seychelles from 11 to 15 May 2017.

Medal overview

Sport sambo

Women 

 64 kg

1. SITCHEPING Paule (CMR)

2. MARIE CHERYL Ella (SEY)

 72 kg

1. FEUGANG KUETHE Edwige (CMR)

2. MARIM YAHYA Zakaria (EGY)

 +80 kg

1. FOKOU Dechantal (CMR)

2. PAYET Amanda (SEY)

3. JEEBUN HENNA Nikeeta (MRI)

Men 

 57 kg

1. ZELMOUMI Mohammed (MAR)

2. SEYNI Abdoul-rachid (NIG)

3. MOUSTAPHA Boubakari (CMR)

 62 kg

1. KOUROU Ayoub (MAR)

2. MAKNI Sami (TUN)

3. MODIBO Coulibaly (CIV)

3. VICTORIN Lanndio (SEY)

 68 kg

1. EL KARS Abderrahim (MAR)

2. SADFI Mohamed Tarek (TUN)

3. YANGFI Eric lionel (CMR)

 74 kg

1. NNOUK Nwatsok (CMR)

2. HLALA Moncef (MAR)

 82 kg

1. MESSI Louis (CMR)

2. OULHAJ Marouan (MAR)

3. FINESSE FANIRY Francis (SEY)

 90 kg

1. CHAKIRI El houcine (MAR)

2. AMADOU MOUMOUNI Mahamadou (NIG)

3. GABRIEL Roge (SEY)

3. NDJIMA ENOWA Raoul (CMR)

 +100 kg

1. DUGASSE Dominic (SEY)

2. MAKREM Saanouni (TUN)

3. LUTCHMUN Sarvesh (MRI)

Combat SAMBO 

 62 kg

1. FOKAM Celestin (CMR)

2. LAGHFIRI Bouchaib (MAR)

3. BEN ANESS Montassar (TUN)

 68 kg

1. MSALLMI Saifallah (TUN)

2. AMIMI Ilias (MAR)

 3. MBOLLO Luc daniel (CMR)

3. WALID IBRAHIM Moawad (EGY)

 74 kg

1. ZOUAD Elhoussine (MAR)

2. MBONG Rene (CMR)

3. ALCINDOR HUBERT Brian (SEY)

 82 kg

1. BATAMAG Epoune (CMR)

2. DIANI Badreddine (MAR)

 90 kg

1. EDDERDAK Nasser (MAR)

2. TCHAMOU Mickael (CMR)

3. WALID RAEY Mohamed (EGY)

 100 kg

1. KARROUTI Reda (MAR)

2. IMARIRENE Mohamed (ALG)

Medals table 

Teams                                                                                     Gold        Silver       Bronze     Total

Morocco                                                                                   7              5              0              12

Cameroon                                                                                7              2              4              13

Tunisia                                                                                    1              3              1              5

Seychelles                                                                               1              2              3              6

Niger                                                                                      0              2              o              2

Egypt                                                                                     0              1              2              3

Algeria                                                                                    0              1              0              1

Mauritius                                                                                 0              0              2              2

Ivory Coast                                                                              0              0              1              1

References 

African Sambo Championships